The 115th United States Congress began on January 3, 2017. There were seven new senators (five Democrats, two Republicans) and 52 new representatives (25 Democrats, 27 Republicans), as well as one new delegate (a Republican), at the start of its first session. Additionally, five senators (two Democrats, three Republicans) and 15 representatives (six Democrats, nine Republicans) took office on various dates in order to fill vacancies during the 115th Congress before it ended on January 3, 2019.

Due to court-ordered redistricting in three states, three representatives were elected from newly established congressional districts.

The co-presidents of the House Democratic freshman class were Nanette Barragán of California, Val Demings of Florida, and Donald McEachin of Virginia, while the president of the House Republican freshman class was Jack Bergman of Michigan. Additionally, the Democratic Freshmen Leadership Representative was Colleen Hanabusa of Hawaii (who was elected during the 114th Congress), and the Republican's freshmen liaison was Paul Mitchell of Michigan.

Senate

Took office January 3, 2017

Took office during the 115th Congress

House of Representatives

Took office January 3, 2017

Non-voting members

Took office during the 115th Congress

See also 
 List of United States senators in the 115th Congress
 List of members of the United States House of Representatives in the 115th Congress by seniority

Notes

References

Freshman class members
115